Expeditionary Strike Group SEVEN/Task Force 76 (Amphibious Force U.S. SEVENTH Fleet) is a United States Navy task force. It is part of the United States Seventh Fleet and the USN's only permanently forward-deployed expeditionary strike group. It is based at the White Beach Naval Facility at the end of the Katsuren Peninsula in Uruma City, Okinawa, Japan.

CTF 76 conducts operations throughout the U.S. Seventh Fleet area of operations, which includes the Western Pacific Ocean and the Indian Ocean.

History 
10 January 1943 – Southwest Pacific Amphibious Forces – later called the Seventh Amphibious Force is formed in Brisbane, Australia. Participated in Operation Chronicle, the landing at Lae, the landing at Scarlet Beach at Finschhafen, Battle of Arawe and Battle of Cape Gloucester on the island of New Britain,

1944 – Participated in the landing at Hollandia, landing at Aitape, landing at Saidor and Admiralty Islands campaign.

1950 – Supported UN during Korean War by stationing ships at Inchon and Wonsan.

1954 – CTF 76 participated in Operation Passage to Freedom, the largest operation of its kind in history. The operation evacuated 310,000 people from communist-controlled North Vietnam to South Vietnam and carried 58,000 tons of cargo and humanitarian aid.

1965 – Participated in amphibious landings, assaults and demonstrations off the eastern coast of the Republic of Vietnam. Also cleared mines off the Vietnamese coast toward the end of the Vietnam War. Amphibious Ready Group Alpha, and its U.S. Marine contingent "Special Landing Force Alpha" or SLF-A (often referred to as the "Sluff", during the Vietnam era) formed Task Group 76.4. Other vessels included LSTs (Landing Ship Tank) or LSD (Landing Ship Dock) supported a reinforced Marine Corps battalion referred to as a Battalion Landing Team (BLT). The Marine elements of the Group were referred to as Special Landing Force Alpha which itself consisted of the BLT and a Marine Helicopter Squadron. The ARG also included an Amphibious Group Command Ship (AGC) or the Amphibious Communication and Command Ship (LCC) which carried the Commander Amphibious Forces, Pacific Fleet and command and communications support facilities. Three AGCs and one LCC rotated to the Western Pacific and all four were involved in the amphibious landings by the LCC/AGC/SLF in Vietnam.

1971 – Homeported to Okinawa, Japan

1975 – Rescued more than 100,000 people from Phnom Penh and Saigon (including in Operation Eagle Pull). Also assisted in recovery of the American-flagged SS Mayaguez after it was hijacked by the Cambodian Khmer Rouge in the Gulf of Thailand.

1983 – Transited to Suez Canal to support multi-national forces in Lebanon.

1999 – Belleau Wood Amphibious Ready Group completed no-notice five-month deployment to Persian Gulf for Operation Desert Fox.

2000 –  and  complete humanitarian mission to East Timor supporting Australian-led forces. Continued missions until East Timor became 191st member of United Nations in 2002.

2004 –  and  deploy to Indonesia in support of Operation Unified Assistance to provide support and aid to the victims of the 26 December tsunami in Southeast Asia.

2005 – Forward Deployed Amphibious Ready Group returns to Sasebo, Japan following unscheduled eight-month surge deployment to North Persian Gulf in support of Operation Iraqi Freedom and the Global War on Terrorism.

2005 – Forward Deployed ARG deploys for Fall Patrol. Conduct Amphibious Landing Exercise/Talon Vision (PHIBLEX/TV) 06 in the Republic of Philippines and then make a port visit to Hong Kong.

2006 – Forward Deployed ARG deploys for 5-month Spring Patrol, participating in TRUEX/MUEX in Guam, Balikatan 06 in the Republic of Philippines, Foal Eagle 06 in the Republic of Korea (ROK) and Cobra Gold in the Kingdom of Thailand.

2006 –  and embarked Explosive Ordnance Disposal Mobile Unit 5 Detachment (Det) 51 complete Summer Patrol throughout Southeast Asia, participating in Cobra Gold and WP-MCMEX in Malaysia, while making port visits to Brunei, Vietnam, Singapore and Hong Kong.

2007 – Forward Deployed ARG participates in joint exercises with the Republic of Korea, Kingdom of Thailand, Australia, Japan, Kingdom of Cambodia, Socialist Republic of Vietnam and the Republic of the Philippines. Task Force 76 units also participated in Operation Sea Angel II, a disaster response mission in the People's Republic of Bangladesh.

2009 – Between 7 August and 18 October, Task Force 76 assigned forces supported Foreign Humanitarian Assistance and Disaster Relief operations in Taiwan, Indonesia and the Republic of the Philippines.

2011 –  assisted in flood relief efforts in Thailand along with elements of the 31st Marine Expeditionary Unit.

2012 – Task Force 76 and assigned units directly participated in 12 bi-lateral exercises including Balikatan, Amphibious Landing Exercise, and Explosive Ordnance Disposal Exercise in the Republic of the Philippines, Cobra Gold in Thailand, Foal Eagle, Clear Horizon and Korean Interoperability Training Program in the Republic of Korea, Valiant Shied, Terminal Fury and Keen Sword in Japan.

Forward-deployed CTF 76 ships and commands 
CTF 76 consists of the following units:

U.S. Fleet Activities Yokosuka, Japan

U.S. Fleet Activities Sasebo, Japan 
 Amphibious Squadron ELEVEN
 
 USS New Orleans (LPD-18)
 
 
 
 Mine Countermeasure Squadron SEVEN
 
 
 
 
Naval Beach Unit SEVEN
Assault Craft Unit ONE, Detachment Western Pacific
Assault Craft Unit FIVE, Detachment Western Pacific
Beach Master Unit ONE, Detachment Western Pacific

Okinawa, Japan 
 Fleet Surgical Team SEVEN
 Tactical Air Squadron TWELVE, Detachment Western Pacific

Pohang, Republic of Korea 
 Helicopter Mine Countermeasures Squadron 14, Detachment ONE

Guam, United States 
 Helicopter Sea Combat Squadron TWO FIVE

Transiting Amphibious Ready Groups 
United States-based Amphibious Ready Groups which pass through the U.S. Seventh Fleet area of operations fall under the operational control of CTF 76.

Task Force / Amphibious Group Commanders to present

References 

 Command History, Seventh Amphibious Force, 10 January 1943 – 23 December 1945
 MacArthur's Amphibious Navy ~ Seventh Amphibious Force Operations 1943–1945, Vice Admiral Danie E. Barbey, USN (Ret), 1969
 Action Report – Iwo Jima, February, 1945
 Navy amphibious force welcomes new commander – Date: 7/28/2003
 Task Force 76 Holds Change of Command in Okinawa – Date: 10/22/2004
 ESG 7/CTF 76 Changes Command – Date: 11/27/2006
 Amphibious Force 7th Fleet Changes Command – Date: 6/23/2008
 Amphibious Force, US 7th Fleet Holds Change of Command Ceremony – Date: 9/10/2013
 Amphibious Force US 7th Fleet Holds Change of Command – Date: 8/31/2015
 Amphibious Force 7th Fleet Changes Command - Date: 8/03/2016
 New commander of Navy 7th Fleet’s amphibious forces takes over - Date: 1/24/2018

External links 

 Commander Task Force 76 News
 Task Force 76/Expeditionary Strike Group 7 - [Link no longer functioning]
 Papers of John M. Lee, commanded the Amphibious Force of the Seventh Fleet in the Pacific, Dwight D. Eisenhower Presidential Library

United States Navy task forces
Military units and formations established in the 1940s